Bítov may refer to places in the Czech Republic:

Bítov (Nový Jičín District) a municipality and village in the Moravian-Silesian Region
Bítov (Znojmo District), a municipality and village in the South Moravian Region
Bítov Castle in the municipality
Bítov, a village and part of Koněprusy in the Central Bohemian Region
Bítov, a village and part of Přehýšov in the Plzeň Region
Bítov, a village and part of Radenín in the South Bohemian Region